Nadavapalli is a village, located in East Godavari district in Katrenikona, in Andhra Pradesh state.

References

Villages in East Godavari district